Associated Grocers was a retailers' cooperative that distributed full lines of groceries and general merchandise. Founded in 1934, it also provided retail services to independent groceries in Washington, Oregon, Alaska, Hawaii, and Guam. Based in Seattle, it served over 300 members’ retail locations with 2004 sales of $794.8 million  before it was acquired by another cooperative, Unified Western Grocers on September 30, 2007.

Executive Officers

John S. Runyan - President and Chief Executive Officer
Steve Numata - Chief Financial Officer 
Craig W. Palm - Vice President and General Counsel 
Carl Morley - Vice President, Fresh Foods 
Craig K. Calton - Vice President, Marketing and Sales 
David L. Brumley - Vice President, Human Resources 
John Wiedmann - Vice President, Wholesale Operations 
Gene F. Puhrmann - Chief Information Officer

References

Companies based in Seattle
Economy of the Northwestern United States
American companies established in 1934
Retail companies established in 1934
Organizations established in 1934
American companies disestablished in 2007
Retail companies disestablished in 2007
Organizations disestablished in 2007
Retailers' cooperatives in the United States
1934 establishments in Washington (state)
2007 disestablishments in Washington (state)